is a stony asteroid and binary system, classified as near-Earth object of the Apollo group, approximately 1 kilometer in diameter. It was discovered on 31 October 2005, by astronomers of the Spacewatch survey at the Kitt Peak National Observatory in Arizona, United States. Its minor-planet moon with an orbital period of 40.25 hours was discovered in 2017.

Orbit and classification 

 is an Amor asteroid that approaches the orbit of Earth from beyond but does not cross it. It orbits the Sun at a distance of 1.1–3.1 AU once every 3 years and 1 month (1,124 days). Its orbit has an eccentricity of 0.47 and an inclination of 4° with respect to the ecliptic. The body's observation arc begins with a precovery image taken by NEAT at Palomar Observatory in November 2002, almost four years prior to its official discovery observation. Due to its high eccentricity, the asteroid is also a Mars-crosser, which means that it also crosses the orbit of Mars (at 1.666 AU).

Close approaches 

On 10 July 2017, it approached Earth to a distance of 0.133 AU and will make its next close approach at 0.128 AU in July 2057.

Physical characteristics 

 is an assumed S-type asteroid.

Rotation period 

Analysis of the best-rated lightcurve gave a rotation period of 40.542 hours with a brightness variation of 1.1 magnitude.

While not being a slow rotator,  has a much longer rotation period than most asteroids, especially for it nearly sub-kilometer size. The lightcurve's high brightness amplitude also indicates that the body has a non-spheroidal shape.

Diameter and albedo 

According to the survey carried out by the NEOWISE mission of NASA's Wide-field Infrared Survey Explorer,  measures 1.045 kilometers in diameter and its surface has an albedo of 0.234, while the Collaborative Asteroid Lightcurve Link assumes a standard albedo for stony asteroids of 0.20 and calculates a diameter of 1.08 kilometers based on an absolute magnitude of 17.2. The asteroid has an estimated density of 1.8 g/cm3.

Binary system 

In May 2017, photometric observations by Brian Warner and Alan Harris revealed that  is a synchronous binary system with a secondary component orbiting around the system barycenter every 40.572 hours. The secondary has been confirmed by radar observations.

Numbering and naming 

This minor planet was numbered by the Minor Planet Center on 19 August 2008. As of 2018, it has not been named.

Notes

References

External links 
 (190166) 2005 UP156  at Las Cumbres Observatory
 (190166) 2005 UP156 at E.A.R.N.
 Asteroids with Satellites, Johnston's Archive
 Asteroid Lightcurve Database (LCDB), query form (info )
 Asteroids and comets rotation curves, CdR – Observatoire de Genève, Raoul Behrend
 
 
 

190166
190166
190166
190166
20051031